The 2022–23 Kosovar Cup is the football knockout competition of Kosovo in the 2022–23 season.

Preliminary rounds

Bracket

First round
The draw for the First Round was held on 7 October 2022 in the offices of the Football Federation of Kosovo. Only 10 teams from the Second League and the Third League of Kosovo participated in this round.

Second round
The draw for the Second Round was held on 14 October 2022. A total of 5 teams participated in this round with Opoja receiving a bye into the Third Round. All matches were played on 19 October 2022.

Third round
Only 3 teams participated in this round. Behar advanced into the Round of 32 without playing a match.

Round of 32
The draw for the Round of 32 took place on 11 November 2022, 13:00 CET. According to the competition regulations, teams in this round must be separated into pots.

Seeding 
A total of 32 teams will participate in this round. Two winners from the preliminary rounds, 10 teams from Superleague and 20 teams from First League of Kosovo will be involved.

Summary 
The matches will take place on 17 November 2022, starting at 12:00 CET. Teams that have more than 2 players selected for the November international friendlies, will play their matches on 23 and 24 November 2022.

Round of 16
The draw for the Round of 16 took place on 1 December 2022. The matches will kick-off at 13:00 CET take place on 4 and 5 February 2023.

Summary

Quarter-finals 
The draw for the Quarter-finals was held on 28 February 2023.

Summary 
The matches will take place on 15 March 2023.

Semi-finals 
The draw for the semi-finals will be held on 21 March 2023.

First leg

Second leg

Statistics

Top scorers

References

Kosovar Cup seasons
Kosovo
Cup